Mirko Alilović (born 15 September 1985) is a Croatian handball goalkeeper for SC Pick Szeged.

He won the silver medals both, on the World Championship (2009) and the European Championship (2008, 2010), and a bronze at the 2012 Summer Olympics.

He was named the best athlete from Ljubuški, Bosnia and Herzegovina in 2007. He was capped 4 times for Bosnia and Herzegovina men's national handball team.

Achievements
Nemzeti Bajnokság I:
Winner: 2012, 2013, 2014, 2015, 2016, 2017, 2021, 2022
Magyar Kupa:
Winner: 2012, 2013, 2014, 2015, 2016, 2017, 2018, 2019
EHF Champions League:
Finalist: 2015, 2016
Semifinalist: 2014
 World Championship:
 Silver Medalist: 2009
 Bronze Medalist: 2013
 European Championship:
 Silver Medalist: 2008, 2010
 Bronze Medalist: 2012, 2016

References

External links
Profile on MKB Veszprém KC official website

1985 births
Living people
People from Ljubuški
Croats of Bosnia and Herzegovina
Croatian male handball players
Olympic handball players of Croatia
Handball players at the 2008 Summer Olympics
Handball players at the 2012 Summer Olympics
Liga ASOBAL players
CB Ademar León players
Olympic bronze medalists for Croatia
Olympic medalists in handball
Medalists at the 2012 Summer Olympics
Expatriate handball players
Croatian expatriate sportspeople in Hungary
Croatian expatriate sportspeople in Slovenia
Croatian expatriate sportspeople in Spain
Veszprém KC players